Bekhan Vakhaevich Agayev (born 29 March 1975, Grozny, Checheno-Ingush Autonomous Soviet Socialist Republic) is a Russian political figure, deputy of the 6th and 8th State Dumas convocations. He is the son of the politician and entrepreneur Vakha Agaev who in 2004 founded the company Yug-nefteprodukt, that primarily focuses on the wholesale distribution of petroleum and petroleum products and previously played an important role in the export of oil from Chechnya.

In 2000 Bekhan Agayev was awarded a Candidate of Sciences degree from the Kabardino-Balkarian State Agrarian University named after V. M. Kokov. In December 2011, he was elected to the State Duma of the 6th convocation, running from the United Russia. Since 19 September 2021 he has served as a deputy of the 8th State Duma.

He is one of the members of the State Duma the United States Treasury sanctioned on 24 March 2022 in response to the 2022 Russian invasion of Ukraine.

References

1975 births
Living people
United Russia politicians
21st-century Russian politicians
Eighth convocation members of the State Duma (Russian Federation)
Sixth convocation members of the State Duma (Russian Federation)
Russian individuals subject to the U.S. Department of the Treasury sanctions